Area code 401 is the sole telephone area code of Rhode Island. 401 is one of the original 86 North American area codes, which were created in 1947. Rhode Island is among the 12 U.S. states or North American jurisdictions with only one area code.

The 401 area code is not projected to be exhausted until 2053.

See also

References

401
401
Telecommunications-related introductions in 1947